Meyniman (known as Kalinovka until 1999) is a village in the municipality of Birinci Meyniman in the Hajigabul Rayon of Azerbaijan. In 2014, it was listed as an abandoned village.

References

Populated places in Hajigabul District